Papakating Creek is a  tributary of the Wallkill River located in Frankford and Wantage townships in Sussex County, New Jersey in the United States. The creek rises in a small swamp located beneath the eastern face of Kittatinny Mountain in Frankford and its waters join the Wallkill to the east of Sussex borough.

Papakating Creek and its three major tributaries drain the northern portion of New Jersey's Kittatinny Valley a fertile valley underlain by shale and limestone of the Ordovician Martinsburg Formation and soils deposited by retreating glaciers in the last ice age. The region which the Papakating Creek and its tributaries drain is largely rural farmland and forests with a few low-density residential communities. The New Jersey Department of Environmental Protection reports that phosphorus and fecal coliform from agricultural or residential runoff as well as arsenic from agricultural pesticide applications or regional mineralogy impair the creek. Within the watershed are lands belonging to two state parks, one federal wildlife refuge, and preserves managed by the New Jersey Natural Lands Trust which set aside tracts for wildlife habitats that protect unique ecosystems and some threatened species.

History and toponymy

On June 29, 1897, the United States Geological Surveys Board of Geographic Names approved the toponym Papakating for a creek in northwestern New Jersey. Papakating is derived from the language spoken by the Munsee (the northern branch of the Lenape or Delaware Indians) who inhabited northern New Jersey, northeastern Pennsylvania, and southern New York and western Long Island at the time of European settlement of eastern seaboard of the United States.

The name Papakating, and several variant spellings, had been recorded for the creek consistently since the American colonial period. Maps and documents at the time of the American Revolution often render the name as Pepocottin or Pepper-Cotton. The name was used for both the creek and its valley, and subsequently during the nineteenth century for a small hamlet that later gave its name to a post office and train depot. The post office was authorized as "Pepokating" on August 26, 1851 and the name revised to the more common spelling of Papakating in 1862. Service to this post office was discontinued in 1923.

Today, the site of a confluence between an unnamed tributary and the Papakating Creek is known as Pellettown and the Board of Geographic Names lists Pellet Creek and Pellettown Creek as historical names that have been used for the creek in the past. These alternate names for the creek, which were used briefly in the nineteenth century, are associated with William Pellet, Jr. (1771–1806) and Obadiah Pellet (1775–1849), who settled along the Papakating after purchasing 600 acres of farmland in Frankford Township in 1801. Obadiah eventually acquired "twelve valuable farms comprising twenty-five hundred acres of land". Pellet established house, grist mill, blacksmith shop and store by 1812, and "the site of these activities was known as Pepocotting (became Papakating), after the stream on which they had located, but gradually adopted the name Pellettown". His son Stephen J. Pellet (1820–1886), a local farmer, merchant, and Justice of the Peace who was appointed the first postmaster of the Papakating post office operating in his store.

Today, the Papakating Creek and its watershed is rural in character; consisting of farmland, forests, and wetlands. There are a few low-density communities. Several of the tributaries of the Papakating Creek have been dammed to create man-made lakes that were the centre of residential developments. in 1926, a dam was erected on Clove Creek in Sussex Borough to create Clove Acres Lake at the site of a former horse racing track and picnic spot. The  lake was developed into a lakeside community in that straddles the border between Sussex and Wantage Township. In the 1950s, Lake Neepaulin in Wantage Township was created by damming an unnamed mountain stream. In 2002, local residents of the Lake Neepaulin community decided to name the unnamed tributary Neepaulakating Creek from a combination of elements of the names Neepaulin and Papakating. Despite its seemingly Native American appearance, Neepaulin is not derived from Munsee or any other Native American language. Lake Neepaulin was named after a combination of the original developers children's names. The Board of Geographic Names approved the name on April 8, 2004.

Course

The stream begins in a small swamp at the foot of Kittatinny Mountain, immediately beneath a prominence along that ridge known as Sunrise Mountain, elevation .

From the source, the Papakating flows southeast through Frankford Township north of the borough of Branchville. In this region, the Papakating is separated from the watershed of the southward-flowing Dry Brook, a tributary of the Paulins Kill, by approximately 500 feet. The two watersheds are divided by a small rise in elevation of 20–30 feet between the drainages the two streams. Immediately to the north of Frankford Plains, a high flat-topped deposit of sand and gravel, the Papakating turns southeast. It generally weaves along the path of George Hill Road in Frankford where it reaches the bottom of Kittatinny Valley and turns to the northeast.

Flowing northeast, the Papakating passes through a series of named crossroads or small hamlets, including Armstrong and Pellettown in Frankford. The stream meanders through several miles of farmland along the floor of Kittatinny Valley. At Pellettown, formerly known as Papakating, the creek is joined by an unnamed tributary and passes under the path of County Route 565. Route 565 is a north–south county highway connecting Sussex borough and New Jersey Route 23 with Ross's Corner (its terminus) where it meets New Jersey Route 15 and U.S. Route 206. From Pelletown, the road runs roughly parallel to the west of the creek's course. A railbed constructed in the 1870s and 1880s by the Pennsylvania, Poughkeepsie & Boston Railroad (PP&B) for a line connecting Slatington, Pennsylvania to Pine Island, New York parallels the creek's east bank through Frankford and Wantage. This line was later operated by the Lehigh and New England Railroad until 1961.

At McCoy's Corner in Wantage, an intersection south of Sussex borough, the waters of the Papakating Creek merge with its tributary West Branch Papakating Creek. The creek continues to flow northeast on the east side of Sussex Airport. To the immediate north of Sussex Airport, at the hamlet of Lewisburg in Wantage, the waters of both Neepaulakating Creek and Clove Brook join the creek. The Papakating begins to turn eastward and is crossed by bridge carrying New Jersey Route 23. The creek enters a dense marsh terrain, historically known as the "Drowned Lands of the Wallkill", before flowing into the Wallkill River east of Sussex borough and north of Hamburg borough.

Watershed

Geology and topography

It includes portions of Frankford, Lafayette, Montague, and Wantage Townships, as well as all of Sussex Borough. According to the New Jersey Department of Environmental Protection (NJDEP), the watershed consists of gently sloping agricultural farm fields, wooded forests, wetlands, low-density residential development and older individually built homes. Its topography ranges from gently rolling in the east to strongly sloping in the west. Its watershed contributes to the Wallkill River which flows north and joins the waters of Rondout Creek at Esopus, New York, a short distance before the Rondout flows into the Hudson River near Kingston, New York.

According to 2002 figures, the watershed was estimated to be home to approximately 11,602 residents of Sussex County.

The Papakating Creek watershed is flanked on the west by Kittatinny Mountain and on the east by the watershed of the Wallkill. To the east of the Wallkill River are the mountains of New Jersey's Highlands physiographic province. Kittatinny Valley is underlain by dark shale and limestone of the Martinsburg Formation and has soils that are glacial in origin. The Martinsburg Formation is a two-mile-thick (3.2 km) layer of a thick turbidite sequence of weaker sedimentary materials, mostly slate, greywacke sandstone, shale, and limestone derived from Ordovician-period deep ocean floor deposits  (540 to 400 million years ago). The creek's watershed is located in the northern Kittatinny Valley in New Jersey which is a segment of the Great Appalachian Valley, a 1,200-miles (1,900 km) trough spanning from Quebec to Alabama. In New Jersey, the northern portion of Kittatinny Valley is drained by the watershed of the Wallkill River of which Papakating Creek is a tributary. Its southern portion is drained by Paulins Kill and Pequest River. The watersheds of northern and southern Kittatinny Valley are divided by a glacial moraine. The Papakating valley's topography and surficial geology is defined by stratified and unstratified drift as well as till and gravel deposits left behind by the retreating glaciers during the Wisconsin glaciation (the last ice age) and feature several kames and kame terraces.

A unique feature in the watershed is Rutan Hill, also called Volcanic Hill, thought to be the throat of an ancient, extinct volcano which was active at the end of the Taconic Orogeny approximately 420 million years ago. This nondescript hill in the Beemerville section of Wantage Township, is the surface expression of a  lamprophyric diatreme that is the northern part of the Late Ordovician Beemerville Alkaline Complex that also includes two large nepheline syenite plutons; and several other nearby and much smaller dikes, sills, and diatremes.

Hydrology and pollution

In 2004, the New Jersey Department of Environmental Protection designated a  segment of Papakating Creek in the vicinity of Sussex Borough and Clove Creek (including Clove Acres Lake) to be impaired by phosphorus loading. The source of most of its presence is derived from the runoff of fertilizer applications on residential lawns and agricultural operations. NJDEP identifies that "runoff from land surfaces was found to comprise a substantial portion of the phosphorus load", citing that large communities of geese that reside within the lake communities along Neepaulakating Creek and the nearby Clove Brook also contribute phosphorus to the creek. Clove Acres Lake is identified as being eutrophic in that phosphorus loading has stimulated excessive growth of algae and aquatic plants resulting in an accelerating aging of the lake, sedimentation and excessive loading of silt and organic matter, fluctuating oxygen saturation and depletion, and that these factors can impact the creek through a potential loss of biodiversity.

The creek is further impaired to a lesser extent by other pollutants including fecal coliform and arsenic. The presence of fecal coliform (chiefly Enterococcus and Escherichia coli) can be attributed both to residential septic and sewage systems and to farm animals and wildlife. While no specific source of arsenic has been identified, NJDEP indicates that possible sources may include the leaching of arsenic into the water from naturally occurring mineralogy within the watershed or to the agricultural use of pesticides.

Tributaries

Climate
Because of its location in the higher elevations of northwestern New Jersey the Papakating Creek's watershed has a cooler humid continental climate or microthermal climate (Köppen climate classification Dfb) which indicates patterns of significant precipitation in all seasons and at least four months where the average temperature rises above . This differs from the rest of the state which is generally a humid mesothermal climate, in which temperatures range  between −3 °C (27 °F) and 18 °C (64 °F) during the year's coldest month. Sussex County is part of USDA Plant Hardiness Zone 6. According to the USDA Natural Resource Conservation Service soil survey, the area receives sunshine approximately 62% of the time in summer and 48% in winter.  Prevailing winds are typically from the southwest for most of year; but in late winter and early spring come from the northwest. The Kittatinny Valley to the north of Newton experiences a snowbelt phenomenon and has been categorized as a microclimate region known as the "Sussex County Snow Belt."  This region receives approximately forty to fifty inches of snow per year and generally more snowfall that the rest of Northern New Jersey and the Northern Climate Zone. This phenomenon is attributed to the orographic lift of Kittatinny Mountain which impacts local weather patterns by increasing humidity and precipitation.

Wildlife and conservation

Several large tracts of land within the Papakating watershed are protected areas administered by state and federal governments. Segments of land along the eastern face Kittatinny Mountain are located within the boundaries of High Point State Park and Stokes State Forest. The mouth of Papakating Creek and several areas purchased by preservation or conservation groups along the river's course (known as the Papakating Creek Preserve) are administered by the New Jersey Natural Lands Trust in partnership with the United States Fish and Wildlife Service as part of the larger Wallkill River National Wildlife Refuge. These areas allow for recreational activities including fishing, hunting, hiking, mountain biking, horseback riding, and birdwatching. Further, Papakating Creek is stocked with several species of trout (brook, brown, and rainbow) in the Spring and early Summer by the New Jersey Division of Fish and Wildlife for recreational fishing.

The New Jersey Natural Lands Trust states that the Papakating Creek watershed offers a variety of habitats for plants and animals, including several that are designated threatened or endangered by the state and federal governments. These habitats include:
Meadows and pastures offer grassland habitat for songbirds and hunting opportunity for red-tailed hawks. The forest lands of ash, maple and hemlock provide cool, shaded conditions to the slow moving creek. Here, raccoon, mink and possum make bridges of the numerous fallen trees which cross the creek. ... Wood frog and salamander utilize fringes of some of the smaller wetlands. Painted turtles and bluegills swim within the deeper oxbows and pools along the Papakating Creek.

In 2010, the Trust for Public Land finalized the purchase of the Armstrong Bog which was described as a rare Calcareous fen wetland site in order to aid the "recovery of the federal threatened and state endangered bog turtle" (Glyptemys muhlenbergii), and preserve "plant habitat for the rare Fraser's Saint John's wort" (Triadenum fraseri). The bog is described as a wet meadow that features the pinkish-purple flowers of New York ironweed and Joe Pye weed in late summer and that "woodchucks have dug their dens on the gently sloping edge between the forest and the old corn field". A smaller parcel features streamside wetlands of arrowwood and elderberry which provides "habitat ideal for wood turtles and yellow-throated warblers".

See also
 Black Dirt Region
 List of landforms in Sussex County, New Jersey
 List of place names of Native American origin in New Jersey
 List of rivers of New Jersey

Notes

References

External links
 Wallkill River Watershed Management Group
 U.S. Geological Survey: NJ stream gaging stations

Rivers of New Jersey
Rivers of Sussex County, New Jersey
Tributaries of the Wallkill River